Contaminated Man is a 2000 dramatic thriller film starring William Hurt, Natascha McElhone, and Peter Weller and directed by Anthony Hickox from a screenplay by John Penney. A co-production between the United States, United Kingdom, Germany, and Hungary and filmed on location in Budapest, the film received mixed-to-negative reviews.

Cast 
 William Hurt as David R. Whitman
 Natascha McElhone as Holly Anderson
 Peter Weller as Joseph Müller
 Katja Woywood as Karin Schiffer
 Michael Brandon as Wyles
 Nikolett Barabas as Hunter
 Hendrick Haese as Peck
 Désirée Nosbusch as Kelly Whitman
 Arthur Brauss as Lead Detective
 Christopher Cazenove as President of Clarion
 Hardy Krüger Jr. as Plant Manager
 Thomas Fritsch as Gambler
 Geraldine McEwan as Lilian Rodgers

References

External links 

2000s thriller drama films
American thriller drama films
British thriller drama films
German thriller drama films
Hungarian thriller drama films
English-language German films
English-language Hungarian films
2000 drama films
2000 films
Films scored by Michael Hoenig
2000s English-language films
2000s American films
2000s British films
2000s German films